Solebury School is a co-educational private boarding and day school located on a  campus in Solebury Township, Bucks County, Pennsylvania, in the United States. Solebury School's academic program features a college-preparatory curriculum with courses and electives in various subjects and a focus on interdisciplinary and experiential education models.

History
Solebury School was conceived by Laurie Erskine, Julian Lathrop, Robert Shaw, and Arthur Washburn in the early 1920s. It opened in September 1925 in rented quarters with four boys and four teachers. A year later, the founders purchased Michener Farm, which remains the institution's site. In 1949 the school merged with another local school, the Holmquist School for Girls, which had a similar educational philosophy and often shared events and productions.

Solebury is often described as a socially progressive or liberal institution. In the 1980s, a local activist and noted anarchist Abbie Hoffman would give speeches to the student body. The school is vocally supportive of its LGBTQ students; it produced an entry for the It Gets Better Project in 2011 and has an active campus club which pertains to gender and sexuality. By participating annually in a local AIDS fundraiser walk, Solebury School has raised thousands of dollars in fundraisers to benefit AIDS patients.

Sexual abuse
After several alums claimed they had been sexually abused as students at Solebury, the school publicly issued a letter of acknowledgment and apology to them by mail in 2014. In a second letter to alums and parents, the school revealed one of its founders had a sexual relationship with a student. A Philly.com article detailed the school's view on the process:

On January 26, 2017, Bucks County published the results of a 2015 grand jury investigation detailing testimony considered credible by the district attorney from six former students alleging sexual abuse at Solebury School from the 1950s through 2005, identifying nine living adults formerly connected with the school who could be prosecuted. The report was critical of the Solebury School's  campus culture as facilitating the abuse.

Before this, the only public sexual abuse scandal at Solebury was an affair between a music teacher and an underage student, which occurred in the mid-1990s and was settled in a civil suit in 1998.

Solebury Environmental Action Club (SEAC)
In 1998, the Solebury Environmental Action Club was founded as a hub for environmental activism at the school. Accomplishments of the club include a campus-wide ban on plastic bottles in 2015, a riparian buffer to revitalize the campus' creek, and an initiative to reduce cafeteria utensil waste. Since 2019, the club has been led by Leel Joseph Moka Dias().

Notable faculty
 Anna Whelan Betts - famous late 19th and early 20th century illustrator in the Victorian style.

Notable alumni
 Peter Hobbs - Actor
 Joyce Bulifant '56 - Actress
 Robert Kenner '68 - Emmy-winning documentary filmmaker
 James MacArthur '56 - Actor
 Margaret Mead (graduated from Holmquist which later merged into Solebury School) - American Cultural Anthropologist
Peggy Shepard - Environmental justice activist
Elizabeth Pitcairn '91 - Classical violinist
Andrew Bynum - NBA All Star

External links
 
 The Association of Boarding Schools profile

Sex abuse case
 
 Bucks County Investigating Grand jury report on sexual abuse at the Solebury School

References

Boarding schools in Pennsylvania
Private high schools in Pennsylvania
Educational institutions established in 1925
Schools in Bucks County, Pennsylvania
1925 establishments in Pennsylvania